John Lee Williamson ( – November 30, 1996) was an American basketball player. He helped the New York Nets win two league championships in the American Basketball Association (ABA) in the 1970s.

Williamson played high school basketball at Wilbur Cross High School in New Haven, Connecticut and played college basketball at New Mexico State University.  He was a 6'2" guard. He was nicknamed "Super John" for his highly efficient jump shooting.

High school career
While at Wilbur Cross High School, Williamson played on the Connecticut state champion teams of 1966–67 and 1967–68. In the 1968 title game, Cross won over Bridgeport Central, 123–82. Williamson's teammates, Alex Scott (24 points), and Clint Davis (40 points) led the way in the romp for Cross's third consecutive title. Williamson contributed 17 points, which was his average that year.

In 1969, Cross was runner up to crosstown rival Hillhouse in 1968–69, losing 76-71 in the final. For Williamson's senior (1969–70) year, he led the nation in scoring, averaging 38.7 points per game. His team was upset in a semi-final match, once again playing Bridgeport Central, with an ending score of 105–103.

College career
Williamson went on to team up with Scott and Davis at New Mexico State University where he averaged 27 points per game within 2 years.

Professional career
As a rookie, Williamson landed a roster spot with the New York Nets of the ABA as a free agent for the 1973–74 season. Before signing with the ABA Nets, he had been eligible for the NBA draft that year, being selected by the Atlanta Hawks in the 6th round with the 96th pick, but didn't make the cut for their roster. Despite being a rookie, Williamson quickly entered the New York starting lineup along with superstar Julius Erving and rising star rookie Larry Kenon (who would get traded a couple of years later). After Williamson became a starter, the team's fortunes quickly turned for the better and the team ended up winning the ABA Championship that season. Williamson was named to the 1974 ABA All-Rookie team.

Continuing with the Nets, Williamson, in Game 6 of the 1976 ABA Finals, scored 28 points with 16 of them coming in the fourth quarter. He and Erving carried the team's offense, combining for 59 points (31 of them from Erving) and leading the Nets to come back from 22 points behind to win the game, the series and the ABA championship.

In the 1976–77 season, Williamson was traded to the Indiana Pacers midseason; in the middle of the next season, he was traded back to the Nets. The Nets would make the playoffs in 1978-79 with Williamson scoring a then-record 38 points for an NBA playoff debut. The Nets would however lose 0-2 in the series to the Philadelphia 76ers. In the 1979–80 season he was traded from the Nets to the Washington Bulletsm who would be the last team he played for before the end of his NBA career until the 1980–81 season. By this time Williamson had largely declined as a player despite being only 29 years old and wouldn't return to the NBA after that season due to contract disagreements in free agency and not maintaining a healthy weight to play.

In 1982, he would play for the CBA Las Vegas Silvers in an attempt to get recruited back into the NBA but never received any offers.

In his ABA/NBA career, Williamson scored 9,017 points. He averaged between 11.5 and 29.5 points in every ABA/NBA season except for his last.

Williamson still holds Nets team records in various categories, including most free throw attempts in a game, with 24 (since tied by Vince Carter and Devin Harris).

Williamson's jersey number (23) was retired by the New York/New Jersey Nets franchise on December 7, 1990; Williamson is one of three players who were with the Nets during their ABA days with a retired number; the other two are Bill Melchionni and Julius Erving.

Personal life
After professional basketball, Williamson would end up working in a juvenile detention center back in his hometown of New Haven, Connecticut.

At age 45, Williamson died of kidney failure related to diabetes on November 30, 1996. He was survived by his wife Bertha Williamson and his four children.

ABA and NBA career statistics

Regular season

|-
| style="text-align:left; background:#afe6fa;"|
| style="text-align:left;"|New York (ABA)
| 77 ||  || 29.4 || .491 || .182 || .789 || 2.8 || 3.2 || 1.1 || .4 || 14.5
|-
| style="text-align:left;"|
| style="text-align:left;"|New York (ABA)
| 75 ||  || 25.0 || .482 || .231 || .837 || 2.0 || 2.6 || .8 || .3 || 11.5
|-
| style="text-align: left;background:#afe6fa;"| 
| style="text-align:left;"|New York (ABA)
| 76 ||  || 29.7 || .450 || .190 || .806 || 2.5 || 2.5 || 1.0 || .4 || 16.2
|-
| style="text-align:left;"|
| style="text-align:left;"|New York Nets
| 42 ||  || 40.5 || .445 ||  || .789 || 2.8 || 2.1 || 1.4 || .1 || 20.8
|-
| style="text-align:left;"|
| style="text-align:left;"|Indiana
| 30 ||  || 38.6 || .480 ||  || .784 || 2.5 || 3.7 || 1.6 || .2 || 20.7
|-
| style="text-align:left;"|
| style="text-align:left;"|Indiana
| 42 ||  || 34.5 || .421 ||  || .832 || 2.9 || 3.1 || 1.1 || .0 || 19.1
|-
| style="text-align:left;"|
| style="text-align:left;"|New Jersey
| 33 ||  || 38.8 || .454 ||  || .857 || 3.2|| 2.5 || 1.4 || .3 || 29.5
|-
| style="text-align:left;"|
| style="text-align:left;"|New Jersey
| 74 ||  || 35.9 || .465 ||  || .854 || 2.6 || 3.4 || 1.2 || .2 || 22.2
|-
| style="text-align:left;"|
| style="text-align:left;"|New Jersey
| 28 ||  || 27.5 || .447 || .421 || .864 || 1.9 || 3.1 || .9 || .3 || 17.7
|-
| style="text-align:left;"|
| style="text-align:left;"|Washington
| 30 ||  || 20.1 || .430 || .188 || .800 || 1.5 || 1.3 || .3 || .3 || 11.6
|-
| style="text-align:left;"|
| style="text-align:left;"|Washington
| 9 ||  || 12.4 || .321 || .167 || .833 || .8 || 1.9 || .4 || .1 || 4.7
|- class="sortbottom"
| style="text-align:center;" colspan="2"|Career
| 516 ||  || 30.1 || .458 || .234 || .826 || 2.5 || 2.8 || 1.1 || .3 || 17.5

Playoffs

|-
| style="text-align:left; background:#afe6fa;"|1974
| style="text-align:left;"|New York (ABA)
| 14 ||  || 30.4 || .450 || .000 || .815 || 3.3 || 2.9 || .7 || .4 || 11.9
|-
| style="text-align:left;"|1975
| style="text-align:left;"|New York (ABA)
| 5 ||  || 23.6 || .605 || .000 || .615 || 2.0	|| 2.0 || .2 || .6 || 12.0
|-
| style="text-align:left; background:#afe6fa;"|1976
| style="text-align:left;"|New York (ABA)
| 10||  || 36.0 || .497 || .333 || .696 || 2.4 || 2.6 || 1.0 || .3 || 22.2
|-
| style="text-align:left;"|1979
| style="text-align:left;"|New Jersey
| 2 ||  || 46.0 || .371 ||  || .813 || 3.0 || 4.0 || 2.0 || .0 || 29.5
|-
| style="text-align:left;"|1980
| style="text-align:left;"|Washington
| 2 ||  || 15.5 || .579|| .333 || 1.000 || 1.0 || .5 || .0 || .0 || 13.5
|- class="sortbottom"
| style="text-align:center;" colspan="2"|Career
| 33||  || 31.1 || .478 || .250 || .743 || 2.7 || 2.6 || .8 || .4 || 16.2

References

External links

 

1951 births
1996 deaths
African-American basketball players
American men's basketball players
Atlanta Hawks draft picks
Basketball players from New Haven, Connecticut
Deaths from kidney failure
Indiana Pacers players
Las Vegas Silvers players
National Basketball Association players with retired numbers
New Mexico State Aggies men's basketball players
New Jersey Nets players
New York Nets players
Parade High School All-Americans (boys' basketball)
Point guards
Shooting guards
Washington Bullets players
20th-century African-American sportspeople
Wilbur Cross High School alumni